A comic novel is a novel-length work of humorous fiction.  Many well-known authors have written comic novels, including P. G. Wodehouse, Henry Fielding, Mark Twain, and John Kennedy Toole. Comic novels are often defined by the author's literary choice to make the thrust of the work—in its narration or plot—funny or satirical in orientation, regardless of the putative seriousness of the topics addressed. While many novels may contain passages or themes that are comic or humorous, the defining characteristic of this genre is that comedy is the framework and baseline of the story, rather than an occasional or recurring motif. Literary scholars distinguish textual analysis on this basis; the theory being that a story by Mark Twain that is a satirical critique in its very origin, for example, must be understood differently than a more literal novelistic plot.
American comic books first gained popularity in the 1930s, and their popularity has fluctuated over the years. Recently, the market for comic books has been expanding. Print and digital comic book sales are increasing. From Spider-Man to The Avengers to Wonder Woman, blockbuster films are introducing people to comic book superheroes and stories, which is increasing the readership. When writing comic books and graphic novels, it is essential to understand the distinction between comic books and graphic novels, as well as the demographics of the target audience. 
A comic book is ″a magazine containing sequences of comic strips″  The average modern comic book contains thirty-two pages, with twenty-two pages of comics and ten pages of advertisements. The standard page size is 6.625" x 10.25", with four to six panels per page. There are numerous types of comics, such as miniseries, one-shot, and ongoing. Four to six issues comprise a mini-series. A one-shot comic book is twenty-two pages long and contains an entire story. An ongoing comic is one that does not have a predetermined ending and continues until it is discontinued.

Notable authors of comic novels

British

One of the most notable British comic novelists is P. G. Wodehouse, whose work follows on from that of Jerome K. Jerome, George Grossmith, and Weedon Grossmith (see The Diary of a Nobody).

Saki's work is also significant, although his career was cut short by World War I.

A. G. Macdonell and G. K. Chesterton also produced flights of whimsy.

Henry Fielding's The History of Tom Jones, a Foundling was a notable mid-18th century work in the genre.

More contemporary British humorists are George MacDonald Fraser, Tom Sharpe, Kingsley Amis, Terry Pratchett, Richard Gordon, Rob Grant, Douglas Adams, Evelyn Waugh, Anthony Powell, Nick Hornby, Helen Fielding, Eric Sykes, Leslie Thomas, Stephen Fry, Richard Asplin, Mike Harding, Joseph Connolly, and Ben Elton.

Irish

James Joyce's Ulysses is considered by some to be a comic novel.

American

Notable American comic novelists include Mark Twain, Richard Brautigan, Philip Roth, John Kennedy Toole, James Wilcox, John Swartzwelder, Larry Doyle, Jennifer Weiner, Carl Hiaasen, Joseph Heller, Peter De Vries, Kurt Vonnegut, Terry Southern, and Christopher Moore.

Persian
Iraj Pezeshkzad

See also

 Comedy
 Fiction

References

Fiction by genre
Literary genres